Zhang Cuiping (born 23 September 1987) is a Chinese sport shooter.

Career
At the 2008 Summer Paralympics, she won a silver medal in the Mixed 10 metre air rifle prone SH1 event, a bronze medal in the Women's 50 metre rifle 3 positions SH1 event and a silver medal in the Mixed 50 metre rifle prone SH1 event.

She won a gold medal in the Women's 10 metre air rifle standing SH1 event at the 2012 Summer Paralympics.

References

1987 births
Living people
Chinese female sport shooters
Paralympic shooters of China
Paralympic gold medalists for China
Paralympic silver medalists for China
Paralympic bronze medalists for China
Paralympic medalists in shooting
Shooters at the 2012 Summer Paralympics
Shooters at the 2008 Summer Paralympics
Shooters at the 2016 Summer Paralympics
Medalists at the 2008 Summer Paralympics
Medalists at the 2012 Summer Paralympics
Medalists at the 2016 Summer Paralympics
Sport shooters from Hebei
Sportspeople from Handan
Shooters at the 2020 Summer Paralympics